Typewriter Eraser, Scale X is a sculpture of a large-scale typewriter eraser by Claes Oldenburg and Coosje van Bruggen.

Constructed in 1999, this model is located at the National Gallery of Art Sculpture Garden.
Other models are also located at Seattle Center near the Museum of Pop Culture, and CityCenter, Paradise. Typewriter Eraser, Scale X is on view at the Norton Museum of Art.

See also
 List of public art in Washington, D.C., Ward 2
 List of works by Oldenburg and van Bruggen

References

External links
Typewriter Eraser, Scale X, Janis Goodman, WETA

1999 sculptures
Collections of the National Gallery of Art
Fiberglass sculptures in the United States
National Gallery of Art Sculpture Garden
Outdoor sculptures in Seattle
Olympic Sculpture Park
Sculptures by Claes Oldenburg
Sculptures by Coosje van Bruggen
Seattle Center
Steel sculptures in Nevada
Steel sculptures in Washington (state)
Steel sculptures in Washington, D.C.